The Henry Sensel Building is a building in southeast Portland, Oregon, listed on the National Register of Historic Places.

Further reading

See also
 National Register of Historic Places listings in Southeast Portland, Oregon

References

External links
 

1909 establishments in Oregon
Buildings and structures completed in 1909
Portland Eastside MPS
Richmond, Portland, Oregon
Portland Historic Landmarks